Federicoanaya is an extinct genus of interatheriine notoungulates that lived during the Late Oligocene in what is now Bolivia. Fossils of this genus have been found in the Salla Formation of Bolivia.

Etymology 
The genus name, Federicoanaya, refers to Federico Anaya, known for his significant contributions to Bolivian paleontology. The specific name, sallaensis, refers to the Salla Formation where it was found.

Description 
Federicoanaya was a small-sized interatheriid. It can be distinguished from other basal interatheriines such as Proargyrohyrax and Santiagorothia, by having hypselodont cheek teeth an completely persistent lingual sulcus on the upper molars. Its permanent upper dentition had thin cementum. Federicoanaya, along with Brucemacfaddenia, share upper cheek teeth with a median lobe and a labially extended parastyle in molars.

Taxonomy 
Federicoanaya was first described in 2008 based on remains found in the Salla Formation, in the La Paz Department, Bolivia, dating to the Late Oligocene, around 29 to 23 mya. It was described alongside another interatheriid, Brucemacfaddenia boliviensis. It is a basal member of the Interatheriidae family, more specifically within the subfamily Interatheriinae.

The following cladogram of the Interatheriinae is based on Vera et al. 2017, showing the position of Federicoanaya.

References 

Typotheres
Prehistoric placental genera
Oligocene mammals of South America
Paleogene Bolivia
Fossils of Bolivia
Deseadan
Fossil taxa described in 2008